James Warnock may refer to:
 James Warnock (engineer)
 James Warnock (murderer)
 Jimmy Warnock, Northern Ireland  boxer